Felimare is a genus of sea slugs, dorid nudibranchs, shell-less marine gastropod molluscs in the subfamily Miamirinae  of the family Chromodorididae.

Taxonomic history
Felimare was described by Eveline & Ernst Marcus in 1967 but treated as a synonym of Hypselodoris until 2012 when it was brought back into use for an eastern Pacific, Atlantic and Mediterranean clade revealed by molecular (DNA) techniques.

Species

 Felimare acriba (Ev. Marcus & Er. Marcus, 1967)
 Felimare agassizii (Bergh, 1894)
 Felimare alaini (Ortea, Espinosa & Buske, 2013)
 Felimare amalguae (Gosliner & Bertsch, 1988)
 Felimare aurantimaculata Ortigosa, Pola & Cervera, 2017
 Felimare bayeri Ev. Marcus & Er. Marcus, 1967
 Felimare bilineata (Pruvot-Fol, 1953)
 Felimare californiensis (Bergh, 1879)
 Felimare cantabrica (Bouchet & Ortea, 1980)
 Felimare ciminoi (Ortea & Valdés, 1996)
 Felimare espinosai (Ortea & Valdés, 1996)
 Felimare fontandraui (Pruvot-Fol, 1951)
 Felimare fortunensis (Ortea, Espinosa & Buske, 2013)
 Felimare francoisae (Bouchet, 1980)
 Felimare fregona (Ortea & Caballer, 2013)
 Felimare garciagomezi (Ortea & Valdés, 1996)
 Felimare gasconi (Ortea, 1996)
 Felimare gofasi (Ortea & Valdés, 1996)
 Felimare juliae (DaCosta, Padula & Schrödl, 2010)
 Felimare kempfi (Ev. Marcus, 1971)
 Felimare lajensis (Troncoso, Garcia & Urgorri, 1998)
 Felimare lalique (Ortea & Caballer, 2013)
 Felimare lapislazuli (Bertsch & Ferreira, 1974)
 Felimare lilyeveae (Alejandrino & Valdés, 2006)
 Felimare malacitana (Luque, 1986)
 Felimare marci (Ev. Marcus, 1971)
 Felimare molloi (Ortea & Valdés, 1996)
 Felimare muniainae (Ortea & Valdés, 1996)
 Felimare nyalya (Ev. Marcus & Er. Marcus, 1967) 
 Felimare olgae (Ortea & Bacallado, 2007)
 Felimare orsinii (Vérany, 1846)
 Felimare picta (Schultz in Philippi, 1836)
 Felimare picta azorica (Ortea, Valdés & García-Gómez, 1996) 
 Felimare pinna (Ortea, 1988)
 Felimare porterae (Cockerell, 1901)
 Felimare ruthae (Ev. Marcus & Hughes, 1974)
 Felimare samueli (Caballer & Ortea, 2012)
 Felimare sechurana Hoover, Padula, Schrödl, Hooker & Valdés, 2017
 Felimare sisalensis Ortigosa & Valdés, 2012
 Felimare sycilla (Bergh, 1890)
 Felimare tema (Edmunds, 1981)
 Felimare tricolor (Cantraine, 1835)
 Felimare villafranca (Risso, 1818)
 Felimare xicoi (Ortea & Valdés, 1996)
 Felimare zebra (Heilprin, 1889)

Species brought into synonymy
 Felimare ghiselini (Bertsch, 1978): synonym of Felimare californiensis (Bergh, 1879)
 Felimare midatlantica (Gosliner, 1990): synonym of Felimare tricolor (Cantraine, 1835)
 Felimare verdensis (Ortea, Valdés & García-Gómez, 1996): synonym of Felimare tema (Edmunds, 1981)

Gallery

References

External links

Chromodorididae
Taxa named by Eveline Du Bois-Reymond Marcus
Taxa named by Ernst Marcus (zoologist)
Gastropod genera